Nemanja Bešović (born June 8, 1992) is a Serbian professional basketball player who last played for Academic Plovdiv of the National Basketball League. At , he plays at the center position.

Professional career
Bešović started playing basketball with youth selections of KK Budućnost Podgorica. He made his debut at senior level with KK Vojvodina Srbijagas during the 2007–08 season. In November 2008, Bešović moved to KK Partizan. Bešović requested termination of his contract on September 22, 2012, after not being selected for friendly games with Fuenlabrada.

On June 17, 2013, he signed a three-year deal with Spirou Charleroi, but was immediately sent on loan to VOO Wolves Verviers-Pepinster.

In September 2016, he signed with Macedonian club Strumica.

Bešović played for Al Ahli Doha of the Qatari Basketball League, averaging 19.5 points and 11.3 rebounds per game. He then signed with Al-Gharafa Doha on December 7, 2018.

In 2019-20 Bešović played for Zob Ahan Isfahan in the Iranian Basketball Super League where he averaged 15.5 points and 6.8 rebounds.  He joined  Academic Plovdiv of the National Basketball League in 2021 and averaged 10.9 points and 3.9 rebounds per game. He parted ways with the team on February 20, 2022.

Serbian national team
Bešović was a member of the Serbian junior team that won a gold medal at the FIBA U18 European Championship in 2009. He also won a silver medal at the 2011 FIBA U19 World Championship.

References

External links
 Nemanja Bešović at euroleague.net
 Nemanja Bešović at eurobasket.com

1992 births
Living people
ABA League players
Basketball League of Serbia players
Centers (basketball)
KK Partizan players
KK Vojvodina Srbijagas players
Serbian men's basketball players
Serbian expatriate basketball people in Belgium
Serbian expatriate basketball people in North Macedonia
Serbian expatriate basketball people in Qatar
Serbs of Montenegro
Sportspeople from Podgorica
RBC Pepinster players
Al-Gharafa SC basketball players
Taoyuan Pilots players
Serbian expatriate basketball people in Taiwan
P. League+ imports